Makeba Sings! is the fifth album by Miriam Makeba, released by RCA Victor in 1965. The album charted at number 74 in the US album chart.

Track listing
 "Cameroon" (Dorothy Masuka, William Salter)
 "Woza" (Hugh Masekela)
 "Little Bird" (Carol Hall)
 "Chove-chuva" (Jorge Ben)
 "Same Moon" (Millard Thomas, Sondra Martin)
 "Kilimanjaro" (Mackay Davashe, Tom Glazer)
 "Khawuyani-Khanyange" (Dorothy Masuka, Miriam Makeba)
 "Wind Song" (Andrea Jean Saks, William Salter)
 "Khuluma" (Betty Khoza)
 "Let's Pretend" (William Salter)
 "Beau Chevalier" (Stéphane Gollman)
 "Maduna" (Miriam Makeba, Hugh Masekela)

References

1965 albums
Miriam Makeba albums
RCA Victor albums